Sayyid Muhammad Moin-ul-Haq OBE (popularly known as Moin Saab) (died 1970), was an Indian coach who made important contributions to sports and education. He was a pioneer of Olympic movement in India, championing the cause for sports all his life. He served as
General Secretary of the Indian Olympic Association (IOA). 
A main organiser of the inaugural Asian Games held in Delhi in 1951. 
Chef-de-mission of the Indian Olympic contingent during the 1948 and 1952 Olympics held in London and Helsinki respectively.  
Indian Olympic Association representative to many Indian national games such as the 1950 Indian National Games in Bombay.
Founding vice-president along with K A D Naoroji of the Bihar Cricket Association, in 1936, at Jamshedpur-Bihar. 
Professor of English, and Principal (1935–53), at the Bihar National College (B N College) in Patna; he urged students to take to sports apart from regular studies.
President of Patna University Teachers Association in 1953. After the formation of B R Ambedkar Bihar University, Muzaffarpur in 1952, a conference of teachers of the University was held in T.N.B. college Bhagalpur; at this conference Prof. Moinul Haque was elected as a President.

Moin saab didn't promote only cricket or football but also tennis, squash, and badminton.

"He was immensely impressed with the strong nation character of the British people and their resilience," says author and retired IPS officer, Sudhir Kumar Jha in his book Patna Reincarnated: A New Dawn.

"Moin saab was like the guardian of sports culture in Patna. He feverishly promoted all kinds of sports among students, first in colleges and later in universities and urged them to take part in sporting competitions. In fact, the sports quota in educational intuitions in Bihar owes its genesis through his efforts only," said Shabab Anwar, veteran sports journalist and commentator based in Patna, who has written on Moin-ul-Haq's life and legacy.

Scholar Sujit Mukherjee, who also played a bit of first-class cricket, spoke highly of Haq in his book Autobiography of an Unknown Cricketer: "... the nearly immortal Principal Moin-ul Haq, holder of the highest offices in various national bodies, saw to it that any talent in any game was given whatever support or encouragement that Patna had to offer," the book says.

Appreciation
The British government appointed an Officer of the Order of the British Empire (OBE) in the 1930 Birthday Honours.
For his immense contribution to the field of sports and as a mark of honour, the then Bihar Chief Minister Abdul Ghafoor in the 1970s renamed Patna's Rajendra Nagar Stadium as 'Moin-ul-Haq Stadium', after the icon's death.
He was awarded the Padma Shri award in the field of sports in 1970 by the Government of India.

References

1970 deaths
Indian Muslims
Sportspeople from Patna
Year of birth missing
Recipients of the Padma Shri in sports
Officers of the Order of the British Empire
India at the Olympics
Indian sports coaches
Presidents of the All India Football Federation
Indian sports executives and administrators
Indian football executives
Indian cricket administrators
Academic staff of Bihar National College